Ngong is the name of several places and things related to Africa:
Ngong, Kenya, a town in Kenya
 Roman Catholic Diocese of Ngong, Kenya
Ngong Hills, a range of hills in Kenya
Ngong (language), spoken in Cameroon
Ngong, Cameroon, a commune in Nord region

See also
Ngong Ping, in Hong Kong